Zhangqiu is one of 10 urban districts of the prefecture-level city of Jinan, the capital of Shandong Province, East China. The district has an area of 1721.29 square kilometers, 20 towns, 908 villages and the permanent resident population was 1,064,210  even though its built-up (or metro) area is much smaller.

History 
Originally called Zhangqiu County with Mingshui as its capital, Zhangqiu City was established in August 1992. Located in central Shandong province, Zhangqiu is 50 kilometers to the east of Jinan, the capital of Shandong province. It is 120 kilometers north from Mount Tai and the Yellow River is the north border of Zhangqiu. Jinan Yaoqiang International Airport is situated at Yaoqiang Village of Zhangqiu.

Zhangqiu is the hometown of the poet Li Qingzhao in the Song Dynasty, and home to Longshan Culture that existed around 2900~2100 BC. Longshan Culture is known for its black ceramics and the earliest features to late characterize the Shang civilization, scapulimancy and hangtu construction (see Chengziya Archaeological Site).

Zhangqiu is known for its springs and scenery outside the crowded city of Jinan. The East Jingshi Road and several Province Highways connect Mingshui and Jinan.

Administrative divisions
As 2017, this county is divided to 15 subdistricts and 3 towns.
Subdistricts

-Subdistricts are upgraded from towns.

Towns
Diao
Duozhuang
Huanghe Township - is upgraded from township.

- Former Town is merged to other.
Shuizhai
- Former Townships is merged to other.
Xinzhai Township

Climate

References

External links
 Zhangqiu government website 

County-level divisions of Shandong
Jinan